Al Udayn District is a district of the Ibb Governorate, Yemen. As of 2003, the district had a population of 143,578 inhabitants. 

The Mocha coffee from this district was highly prized, and called Uden.

Uzal of Al-Udayn 
There are 22 Uzal in Al-Udayn.

 Bani Awad
 Al-ghadibah
 Bani Hat
 Ṣanid alsharqi
 ‘Urdun
 Al-radhayai
 Al-wadi
 Bilad Al-maliki
 Jabal Bahri
 Bani Zahir
 Ghabir
 Bani ‘Amran
 Shalaf
 Al-jabalin
 Sharaf Hatim
 Qadaas
 Qasl
 Bani Abdullah
 Al-amarna
 Khabaz
 Qas‘a Hilyan
 Al-ssaruh
 Hoqain

References

Districts of Ibb Governorate
Al Udayn District